The 2018 FINA Men's Water Polo World League is the 17th edition of the annual men's international water polo tournament. It will be played between November 2017 and June 2018 and opened to all men's water polo national teams. After participating in a preliminary round, eight teams qualify to play in a final tournament, called the Super Final from 18–23 June 2018. The top two teams also automatically qualify for the 2019 FINA World Aquatics Championships in 2019.

In the world league, there are specific rules that do not allow matches to end in a draw. If teams are level at the end of the 4th quarter of any world league match, the match will be decided by a penalty shootout. Teams earn points in the standings in group matches as follows:

 Match won in normal time – 3 points
 Match won in shootout – 2 points
 Match lost in shootout – 1 point
 Match lost in normal time – 0 points

Preliminary rounds

European Preliminaries  
 November 14, 2017 – April 10, 2018

Group A

Group B

Group C

Inter-Continental Cup 
April 3–8, 2018, Auckland, New Zealand
All times are New Zealand Standard Time (UTC+12:00)

Group A

Group B

Final round
9th Place

7th Place

5th Place

3rd Place

1st Place

Final ranking

Super Final 
 June 18–23, 2018, Danube Arena, Budapest, Hungary
 All times are Central European Summer Time (UTC+02:00)

Qualified teams

Seeding

Group A

Group B

Knockout stage

5th–8th Places

Quarterfinals

5th–8th Semifinals

Semifinals

Seventh place

Fifth place

Third place

Final

Final ranking

Awards

References

 Rules & Regulations

World League, men
FINA Water Polo World League
International water polo competitions hosted by Hungary